Yann Guichard (born 23 May 1974) is a French sailor. He competed in the Tornado event at the 2000 Summer Olympics.

References

External links
 

1974 births
Living people
French male sailors (sport)
Olympic sailors of France
Sailors at the 2000 Summer Olympics – Tornado
Sportspeople from Paris